Canonchet is a small village in the town of Hopkinton in the U.S. state of Rhode Island. Canonchet is located due northeast of the center of Hopkinton and both Interstate 95 and Rhode Island Route 3 run through the village. Intertstate 95's Exit 2 is located in Canonchet.  Canonchet is also the name of a Narragansett sachem in the area who was executed during King Philip's War.

Geography
Other places in Canonchet include:
 Wood River Health Services
 Canonchet Cliffs (a private neighborhood for the elderly)
 Buick, LLC/The Beadery (manufacturer of injection molded plastic beads and maker of the Wonder Loom).

Villages in Washington County, Rhode Island
Villages in Rhode Island